A list of American films released in 1960.

The Apartment won the Academy Award for Best Picture.



A-C

D-H

I-M

N-S

T-Z

See also
 1960 in the United States

External links

1960 films at the Internet Movie Database

1960
Films
Lists of 1960 films by country or language